The Lefty Driesell Defensive Player of the Year Award is an award given annually to the most outstanding men's college basketball defender in NCAA Division I competition. The award was established in 2010 and is named for head coach Lefty Driesell, who is the only head coach to amass 100 wins at four different Division I schools and is best remembered for his success with the Davidson Wildcats and Maryland Terrapins programs.

Winners

Winners by school

References
General

Specific

External links
Official site

Awards established in 2010
College basketball trophies and awards in the United States
2010 establishments in the United States